James Delbourgo (1972) is a writer and historian of science, collecting and museums. He is the James Westfall Thompson Chair and Distinguished Professor of History at Rutgers University.

Delbourgo was born in Britain to Italian parents and educated at Reigate Grammar School, the University of East Anglia, Cambridge (Christ's College), Penn and Columbia. He previously taught at McGill University in Montreal, where he directed the program in History and Philosophy of Science; and was Visiting Professor of History of Science at Harvard in 2016.

His most recent book, Collecting the World (2017), explores the life and career of Hans Sloane, which culminated in the foundation of the British Museum in 1753. It is based on 15 years of research in Sloane's surviving London collections in collaboration with the British Museum, Natural History Museum and British Library. Published by Penguin in the UK and Belknap in the US, the book won four prizes, made four shortlists, and was named Book of the Week in the Guardian, London Times, Daily Mail and The Week Magazine, and one of Apollo Magazine's Books of the Year; featured in BBC Radio's Today Programme and NPR's Leonard Lopate Show, the British Museum and BBC History Magazine podcasts, Science Magazine and Smithsonian Magazine; and reviewed in the New York Times, New York Review of Books, New Republic, Financial Times, the Spectator, the Economist, the Lancet, Daily Telegraph, Irish Times, Nature Magazine and Art Quarterly. Delbourgo has lectured on Sloane & the British Museum in the UK, Germany, Italy, France, Jamaica and the US.

Recent magazine essays range in subject from Arab world space programs to Russo-Asian de-extinction projects; and  collecting from early modern Korea to Gilded Age America. He writes regularly for the Literary Review in London. 

Current projects include a history of collectors forthcoming from W. W. Norton & Company (NY) and Quercus/ riverrun (London); a global approach to the history of science; and Divers Things, on the cultural history of underwater exploration.

Selected publications
 Collecting the World: Hans Sloane and the Origins of the British Museum (Penguin and Harvard, 2017): Leo Gershoy Award (AHA), Louis Gottschalk and Annibel Jenkins Prizes (ASECS), Hughes Prize (BSHS).
 The Brokered World: Go-Betweens and Global Intelligence, 1770-1820, co-editor with Simon Schaffer, Lissa Roberts and Kapil Raj (Science History Publications, 2009).
 Science and Empire in the Atlantic World, co-editor with Nicholas Dew (Routledge, 2007).
 A Most Amazing Scene of Wonders: Electricity and Enlightenment in Early America (Harvard, 2006): Thomas J Wilson Prize (HUP).

References 

https://www.hup.harvard.edu/catalog.php?isbn=9780674237483&content=bios
https://histsci.fas.harvard.edu/people/james-delbourgo
https://www.penguin.co.uk/authors/73569/james-delbourgo.html?tab=penguin-books
https://journals.sagepub.com/doi/abs/10.1177/0073275319831582

British historians
Living people
1972 births
Rutgers University faculty